Ian James Gray (born 25 February 1975 in Manchester) is an English former professional footballer, who made 163 appearances in the Football League as a goalkeeper playing for Rochdale, Stockport County, Rotherham United and Huddersfield Town.

He was forced into an early retirement in 2004 at the age of 29 because of a broken hand sustained during an FA Cup 1st Round tie against Accrington Stanley while he was playing for Huddersfield Town.

References

External links 
 

1975 births
Living people
Footballers from Manchester
English footballers
Association football goalkeepers
Huddersfield Town A.F.C. players
Rotherham United F.C. players
Rochdale A.F.C. players
Stockport County F.C. players
Oldham Athletic A.F.C. players
English Football League players